Ta Phou is a khum (commune) of Svay Chek District in Banteay Meanchey Province in north-western Cambodia.

Villages

 Ta Phou
 Pongro
 Ta Srei
 Prech Kei
 Kouk Kei
 Khmoas
 Thmei
 Baray
 Phchoek
 Prech Tboung
 Bantoat Baoh

References

Communes of Banteay Meanchey province
Svay Chek District